Cara de Niño (Baby Face) is Jerry Rivera's fourth studio album. The album was nominated at the 37th Grammy Awards for Best Tropical Latin Album.  The lead single, Que Hay de Malo, became Rivera's first single to reach on the top ten peaking at number-four.

Track listing
 Solo Tu
 Que Hay de Malo
 Cara de Niño
 No Hieras Mi Vida
 Dia y Noche Pienso
 En Las Nubes 
 No Me Puedes Dejar Asi
 Deseo Loco 
 Para Ti 
 Por Tenerte

Chart position

Album

Singles

Critical reception

Allmusic gave the album a 4.5 out of 5 cites the album as one of his finest albums produced.

Certification

References

1993 albums
Jerry Rivera albums
Sony Discos albums